Wahidullah Faghir (born 29 July 2003) is a Danish professional footballer who plays as a forward for Danish Superliga club Nordsjælland, on loan from VfB Stuttgart.

Early life
Faghir was born in Vejle, Region Syddanmark, Denmark. His parents are both Afghans who fled to Denmark from Taliban rule.

Club career

Vejle
Faghir started his footballing career with the Vejle BK youth academy in 2009, and signed his first official youth contract in October 2018 at age 15. Upon signing, Vejle head of youth Steen Thychosen stated that "There is a bit of 'Zlatan' [Ibrahimović, red.] about him, because he performs with an indomitable self-confidence in practice and matches."

On 13 July 2020, Faghir made his first professional appearance for Vejle, coming on as a substitute for Lucas Jensen in the 23rd minute in a match against Kolding IF. On 14 September 2020, he made his debut in the Danish Superliga in a match against AGF.

VfB Stuttgart
On the last day of the transfer window 31 August 2021, Faghir moved to Bundesliga club VfB Stuttgart, where he signed a five-year contract. A year after his arrival to the German club, Faghir was loaned out to Danish Superliga side FC Nordsjælland for the 2022-23 season.

International career
Faghir has played internationally for Denmark at under-16, under-17 and under-18 levels.

Career statistics

References

External links 
 Official Danish league stats at danskfodbold.com 
 

2003 births
Living people
People from Vejle Municipality
Sportspeople of Afghan descent
Danish men's footballers
Association football forwards
Danish Superliga players
Vejle Boldklub players
VfB Stuttgart players
FC Nordsjælland players
Danish 1st Division players
Denmark youth international footballers
Denmark under-21 international footballers
Danish people of Afghan descent
Danish expatriate men's footballers
Expatriate footballers in Germany
Danish expatriate sportspeople in Germany
Sportspeople from the Region of Southern Denmark